Beta-defensin 104 is a protein that in humans is encoded by the DEFB104A gene.

Function 

Defensins form a family of microbicidal and cytotoxic peptides made by neutrophils. Defensins are short, processed peptide molecules that are classified by structure into three groups: alpha-defensins, beta-defensins and theta-defensins. All beta-defensin genes are densely clustered in four to five syntenic chromosomal regions. Chromosome 8p23 contains at least two copies of the duplicated beta-defensin cluster. This duplication results in two identical copies of defensin, beta 104, DEFB104A and DEFB104B, in head-to-head orientation. This gene, DEFB104A, represents the more centromeric copy.

References

Further reading 

 
 
 
 
 
 
 
 
 

Defensins